Éric Cayrolle (born 27 August 1962 in Pau) is a French auto racing driver.

Racing career 
He is a three-time champion of the French Supertouring Championship, winning for three consecutive years between 1996 and 1998. Prior to this he competed in Formula Renault and Formula Three in his native country. After his success in the French Supertouring Championship he moved to the European series in 2001, which became the European Touring Car Championship the following year. Since then he has also competed in the French GT Championship.

He made a brief return to touring cars in 2009, competing in the two rounds of the FIA World Touring Car Championship at his home town of Pau. He drove a SEAT León for SUNRED Engineering, winning the Independent's category in the second race despite having an accident while leading the class with one lap to go. He crashed in to the barriers and was clipped by the Chevrolet Cruze of Nicola Larini, bringing out the red flag for the second-time in the race. However, the race results were determined by the positions on the previous lap and Cayrolle finished the race eighth overall and winner of the independent's category.

Racing record

Complete European Touring Car Championship results
(key) (Races in bold indicate pole position) (Races in italics indicate fastest lap)

Complete World Touring Car Championship results
(key) (Races in bold indicate pole position) (Races in italics indicate fastest lap)

Complete World Touring Car Cup results
(key) (Races in bold indicate pole position) (Races in italics indicate fastest lap)

‡ As Cayrolle was a Wildcard entry, he was ineligible to score points.

References

External links
 

1962 births
Living people
Sportspeople from Pau, Pyrénées-Atlantiques
French racing drivers
Formule Campus Renault Elf drivers
French Formula Three Championship drivers
American Le Mans Series drivers
FIA GT Championship drivers
World Touring Car Championship drivers
Blancpain Endurance Series drivers
24 Hours of Spa drivers
European Touring Car Championship drivers
24H Series drivers
World Touring Car Cup drivers
Tech 1 Racing drivers
Comtoyou Racing drivers
Le Mans Cup drivers
GT4 European Series drivers